USS Naubuc may refer to the following ships of the United States Navy:

, a monitor during the American Civil War
, a net laying ship in operation at the end of World War II

United States Navy ship names